Montería is a municipality and city located in northern Colombia and is the capital of the Department of Córdoba. The city and region are known for their distinct cultural heritages, which include a blend of mainly colonial Spanish descendants, indigenous Zenú peoples, Crypto-Jews, and more recently, Middle East immigrants. The city is home to the Sombrero Vueltiao, a national symbol; and is the home of Porro folklore music. The city has an inland seaport connected to the Caribbean Sea by the Sinú River.

History
The area where the Department of Córdoba is located today was first settled by Zenú Indians, who lived near the banks of three rivers: the Sinú (Finzenú), the San Jorge (Panzenú) and the Nechí (Zenúfana).   Montería was founded on May 1, 1777 by Spanish officer Antonio de la Torre y Miranda, being governor of the Province of Cartagena officer Juan de Torrezar Díaz Pimienta.  The city, which had been named Montería by its inhabitants and located on the east side of the Sinú river, was then renamed "San Jerónimo de Buenavista" and moved to the west side of the river.

San Jerónimo de Buenavista was chosen by Antonio de la Torre y Miranda to name the city, in order to honor Saint Jerome, but people referred to it as Montería.  In 1803, the city was burned by a group of natives, so the residents decided to move back to the Sinú's east bank, where it remains today. In recent years, Monteria has seen a growth in population on the west side.  In 1923, it became a municipality of Bolívar Department, and in 1952, it was designated as capital of the new Department of Córdoba. Montería was located within the boundaries of the Colombian Department of Bolívar until 1952 when it separated from Bolívar and became the capital of the new Department of Córdoba.

With a population of approximately 400,000, the city is considered to be one of the ten most important cities in Colombia and is locally known as La Perla del Sinú (The Pearl of the River Sinú).

Geography and climate

The city, which lies in the Sinú valley, is divided by the Sinú river and surrounded and sparsely populated by tropical flora and fauna. The area is subject to flooding.

Media and communications

Newspapers
 El Espectador (national daily newspaper)
 El Heraldo de Barranquilla (regional newspaper)
 Diario El Meridiano de Córdoba(regional newspaper)
 El Tiempo (national daily newspaper)
 El Universal (regional newspaper)

Economy
The town's economy is based mainly on cattle farming, and a very prosperous commercial district consisting of modern malls, shops, and restaurant chains.  It is considered to be the Cattle Farming Capital of Colombia and celebrates this title with a yearly festival.

Plus, the city is one of the most important destination with venues of the country by having Great Stadiums and  Convention centers, and have received important celebrities such as Maelo Ruiz, Jorge Celedón, Shakira, Years and Years, Juanes, Carlos Vives, among others.

Transportation
Monteria lies on a major highway connecting Medellín to Sincelejo and extending to Cartagena and Barranquilla.  It has an effective public transportation system and arterial connections to the rest of the country.

Public transportation
As is common in most Colombian municipalities, public transportation is tightly integrated into the city.  A system of taxis and several lines of large and small buses serve the community on surface streets. The streets of Monteria are also full of motorcycle taxis or "rapimotos" that provide economical transportation.

A passenger-only ferry system known as "Planchones", consists of roofed wooden rafts. It traverses the Sinu river along a system of manual cable tows. It was made as a way to cross the river before a proper bridge could be built and has served as an alternative to cross the river ever since. It is one of the most remarkable features of the city.

Water

The city is served by a fishing port, but the waters of the Sinu river do not run deep enough and are not wide enough to serve as a commercial channel.  High quality sand is brought up from the bottom of the river in buckets placed by divers, for use in the making of cinder blocks for local and regional construction projects.

Air travel
Monteria is home to an international airport, Los Garzones Airport, which provides service to major cities via Avianca, Easyfly and LATAM airlines.

Major cities served from the airport include Bogotá, Medellín, Cali and Panama City.

Demographics
The region is populated by a diverse mix of people, including the descendants of Spaniards/Basque, Arabs, French, Italians and Sinu Indians.

Tourism and sport

Sites of interest

Sites of interest in Monteria include:
 The city's 1st Avenue runs along the Sinú river.
 Simon Bolivar Park separates the river from 1st Avenue and is home to wild monkeys and sloths.
 San Antero Beach is a beach which has a lot of tourist attractions.
 The Colonial-era Cathedral of Saint Jeronimo is surrounded by a park.
 Alamedas del Sinu is a shopping center in the area.
 The bridge spanning the Sinu river is a local landmark.
 Centro Comercial Buenavista Montería

Sporting clubs
 Centro Recreacional Tacasuán
 Club Campestre
 Club de golf
 Jaguares de Cordoba - Professional Soccer team that plays in Jaraguay Stadium in Montería

Education
Both public and private educational institutions run the gamut from unlicensed private preschools to fully accredited universities.

Universities
 University of Cordoba  (website) (Public)
 Universidad Pontificia Bolivariana (website) (Catholic)
 Universidad del Sinú
 Fundación Universitaria Luis Amigó
 Cooperative University of Colombia
 Corporación Universitaria del Caribe

Health care
A new hospital was recently constructed in Barrio Urbina, called The Hospital of Saint Jeronimo. Other facilities include 2 government hospitals, 17 health care facilities and 32 health care clinics.

External links and references
 El Meridiano De Cordoba - Local Paper (Spanish).
 Fact Sheet, Colombian Government
 Cordoba Official Government Website
 Monteria Official Government Website
 https://web.archive.org/web/20120414101215/http://www.turismonteria.com/

References

 
Capitals of Colombian departments
Cordoba